The 1937 Paris–Roubaix was the 38th edition of the Paris–Roubaix, a classic one-day cycle race in France. The single day event was held on 28 March 1937 and stretched  from Paris to its end in a velodrome in Roubaix. The winner was Jules Rossi from Italy.

Results

References

Paris–Roubaix
Paris–Roubaix
Paris–Roubaix
Paris–Roubaix